Jord may refer to:

 Jörð (Old Norse: Jǫrð, meaning "soil, earth, dirt"), a Norse goddess
 Jord International, Australian custom manufacturing company
 Jord Engineers India, a manufacturing company of India
 Jord Corona, planet Venus; a volcanic dome; see List of coronae on Venus
 Mount Jord, Asgard Range, Victorialand, Antarctica; a mountain
 Jord Samolesky, Canadian musician, drummer for the Canadian punk band Propagandhi
 A diminutive of the name Jordan (name)

See also

 
 Gord (disambiguation)
 Gordon (disambiguation)
 Jordan (disambiguation)
 Lajord